John Alexander was the defending champion but lost in the final 6–4, 6–4 against Eddie Dibbs.

Seeds
All sixteen seeds received a bye to the second round.

  Eddie Dibbs (champion)
  Brian Gottfried (third round)
  Manuel Orantes (semifinals)
  Corrado Barazzutti (semifinals)
  Harold Solomon (quarterfinals)
  José Higueras (second round)
  Wojciech Fibak (quarterfinals)
  Ken Rosewall (second round)
  John Alexander (final)
  Arthur Ashe (third round)
  Jaime Fillol (third round)
  Tim Gullikson (third round)
  Stan Smith (second round)
  Hans Gildemeister (third round)
  Robert Lutz (second round)
  Hank Pfister (third round)

Draw

Finals

Top half

Section 1

Section 2

Bottom half

Section 3

Section 4

External links
 1978 Volvo International draw 

Singles